In Germanic paganism, Baduhenna is a goddess. Baduhenna is solely attested in Tacitus's Annals where Tacitus records that a sacred grove in ancient Frisia was dedicated to her, and that near this grove 900 Roman soldiers were killed in 28 CE. Scholars have analyzed the name of the goddess and linked the figure to the Germanic Matres and Matronae.

Etymology
The first element of the goddess's name, Badu-, may be cognate to Proto-Germanic  meaning "battle." Rudolf Simek states that the goddess's name etymology implies that the goddess is associated with war, and Simek points out that sacred groves are commonly associated with the Germanic peoples.

Attestation
Baduhenna is solely attested in book 4, chapter 73 of Tacitus's Annals. In chapters 73 and 74 of Annals, Tacitus describes the defeat of the Roman army in ancient Frisia:

See also
 "Isis" of the Suebi, a Germanic goddess mentioned by Tacitus in his Germania
 Nerthus, a Germanic goddess mentioned by Tacitus in his Germania
 Regnator omnium deus, a Germanic god mentioned by Tacitus in his Germania 
 Tamfana, a Germanic goddess mentioned by Tacitus in his Annals

Notes

References

 Church, Alfred John. Brodribb, William Jackson (Trans.) (1876). Annals of Tacitus. MacMillan and Co.
 Frost, Percival (1872). The Annals of Tacitus. Whittaker & Co.
 Simek, Rudolf (2007) translated by Angela Hall. Dictionary of Northern Mythology. D.S. Brewer. 

Germanic goddesses
Trees in Germanic paganism
Germanic deities